The women's openweight competition at the 2010 Asian Games in Guangzhou, China was held on 16 November 2010 at the Huagong Gymnasium with ten competitors.

Liu Huanyuan of China won the gold medal.

Schedule
All times are China Standard Time (UTC+08:00)

Results

Main bracket

Repechage

References

Results

External links
 
 Draw

W999
Judo at the Asian Games Women's Openweight
Asian W999